The Ericaceae are a family of flowering plants, commonly known as the heath or heather family, found most commonly in acidic and infertile growing conditions. The family is large, with c.4250 known species spread across 124 genera, making it the 14th most species-rich family of flowering plants. The many well known and economically important members of the Ericaceae include the cranberry, blueberry, huckleberry, rhododendron (including azaleas), and various common heaths and heathers (Erica, Cassiope, Daboecia, and Calluna for example).

Description
The Ericaceae contain a morphologically diverse range of taxa, including herbs, dwarf shrubs, shrubs, and trees. Their leaves are usually evergreen, alternate or whorled, simple and without stipules. Their flowers are hermaphrodite and show considerable variability. The petals are often fused (sympetalous) with shapes ranging from narrowly tubular to funnelform or widely urn-shaped. The corollas are usually radially symmetrical (actinomorphic) and urn-shaped, but many flowers of the genus Rhododendron are somewhat bilaterally symmetrical (zygomorphic). Anthers open by pores.

Taxonomy 
Michel Adanson used the term Vaccinia to describe a similar family, but  first used the term Ericaceae. The name comes from the type genus Erica, which appears to be derived from the Greek word . The exact meaning is difficult to interpret, but some sources show it as meaning 'heather'. The name may have been used informally to refer to the plants before Linnaean times, and simply been formalised when Linnaeus described Erica in 1753, and then again when Jussieu described the Ericaceae in 1789.

Historically, the Ericaceae included both subfamilies and tribes. In 1971, Stevens, who outlined the history from 1876 and in some instances 1839, recognised six subfamilies (Rhododendroideae, Ericoideae, Vaccinioideae, Pyroloideae, Monotropoideae, and Wittsteinioideae), and further subdivided four of the subfamilies into tribes, the Rhododendroideae having seven tribes (Bejarieae, Rhodoreae, Cladothamneae, Epigaeae, Phyllodoceae, and Diplarcheae). Within tribe Rhodoreae, five genera were described, Rhododendron L. (including Azalea L. pro parte), Therorhodion Small, Ledum L., Tsusiophyllum Max., Menziesia J. E. Smith, that were eventually transferred into Rhododendron, along with Diplarche from the monogeneric tribe Diplarcheae.

In 2002, systematic research resulted in the inclusion of the formerly recognised families Empetraceae, Epacridaceae, Monotropaceae, Prionotaceae, and Pyrolaceae into the Ericaceae based on a combination of molecular, morphological, anatomical, and embryological data, analysed within a phylogenetic framework. The move significantly increased the morphological and geographical range found within the group. One possible classification of the resulting family includes 9 subfamilies, 126 genera, and about 4000 species:

Enkianthoideae Kron, Judd & Anderberg (one genus, 16 species)
Pyroloideae Kosteltsky (4 genera, 40 species)
Monotropoideae Arnott (10 genera, 15 species)
Arbutoideae Niedenzu (up to six genera, about 80 species)
Cassiopoideae Kron & Judd (one genus, 12 species)
Ericoideae Link (19 genera, 1790 species)
Harrimanelloideae Kron & Judd (one species)
Epacridoideae Arn. (=Styphelioideae Sweet) (35 genera, 545 species)
Vaccinioideae Arnott (50 genera, 1580 species)

Genera 
See the full list at List of Ericaceae genera.

Distribution and ecology
The Ericaceae have a nearly worldwide distribution. They are absent from continental Antarctica, parts of the high Arctic, central Greenland, northern and central Australia, and much of the lowland tropics and neotropics.

The family is largely composed of plants that can tolerate acidic, infertile conditions. Like other stress-tolerant plants, many Ericaceae have mycorrhizal fungi to assist with extracting nutrients from infertile soils, as well as evergreen foliage to conserve absorbed nutrients. This trait is not found in the Clethraceae and Cyrillaceae, the two families most closely related to the Ericaceae. Most Ericaceae (excluding the Monotropoideae, and some Epacridoideae) form a distinctive accumulation of mycorrhizae, in which fungi grow in and around the roots and provide the plant with nutrients. The Pyroloideae are mixotrophic and gain sugars from the mycorrhizae, as well as nutrients.

In many parts of the world, a "heath" or "heathland" is an environment characterised by an open dwarf-shrub community found on low-quality acidic soils, generally dominated by plants in the Ericaceae. A common example is Erica tetralix. This plant family is also typical of peat bogs and blanket bogs; examples include Rhododendron groenlandicum and Kalmia polifolia. In eastern North America, members of this family often grow in association with an oak canopy, in a habitat known as an oak-heath forest.

In heathland, plants in the family Ericaceae serve as hostplants to the butterfly Plebejus argus.

Some evidence suggests eutrophic rainwater can convert ericoid heaths with species such as Erica tetralix to grasslands. Nitrogen is particularly suspect in this regard, and may be causing measurable changes to the distribution and abundance of some ericaceous species.

References

Bibliography

External links

 Ericaceae at The Plant List 
 Ericaceae, Epacridaceae , Empetraceae, Monotropaceae, and Pyrolaceae at The Families of Flowering Plants (DELTA)
 Ericaceae at the Encyclopedia of Life
 Ericaceae at the Angiosperm Phylogeny Website
 Ericaceae at the online Flora of North America
 Ericaceae at the online Flora of China
 Ericaceae at the online Flora of Pakistan
 Ericaceae at the online Flora of Chile
 Epacridaceae at the online Flora of New Zealand
 Epacridaceae  at the online Flora of Western Australia 
 Ericaceae at Ericaceae.org
 Ericaceae at Australian Tropical Rainforest Plants
 Neotropical Blueberries at the New York Botanical Garden

 
Ericales families